TV3 is the brand name used by Viasat's flagship channels in Scandinavia, the Baltic States, Hungary, and Finland. Viasat is part of the Swedish media company Modern Times Group. The first TV3 channel was launched on New Year's Eve 1987, breaking the monopoly on broadcasting in the Scandinavian languages.

TV3 broadcasts at least six separate channels in Scandinavia and the Baltic States, each with a share of localized entertainment and documentaries produced in the respective domestic languages. All the channels are broadcast from West Drayton, Middlesex in the United Kingdom, which means that Viasat is able to circumvent the more stringent criteria for commercial messages that apply in the Scandinavian countries, specifically in relation to advertisements aimed directly at children, and the stricter rules on interrupting programs with commercials.

Countries 
At launch, there was one TV3 channel for all the Scandinavian countries. Separate channels for Denmark and Norway were soon launched so that there was a TV3 channel for each country. In the 1990s, TV3 expanded to cover the Baltic countries. Although Viasat's latest channels are not named TV3 they are all very much based on the TV3 model.

The channels that use the TV3 concept are:
 TV3 Sweden
 TV3 Denmark
 TV3 Norway
 TV3 Estonia
 TV3 Latvia
 TV3 Lithuania
 TV3 Slovenia
 Viasat 3 (Hungary)

See also 
 List of Danish television channels
 List of Estonian television channels
 List of Finnish television channels
 List of Latvian television channels
 List of Lithuanian television channels
 List of Norwegian television channels
 List of programs broadcast by TV 3 in Norway
 List of Swedish television channels
 List of television stations in Slovenia
 TV1000
 TV6
 TV8
 ZTV
 ZTV Norway

External links 
 TV3 – Denmark
 TV3 – Estonia
 TV3 – Latvia
 TV3 – Lithuania
 TV3 – Norway
 TV3 – Sweden
 Viasat3 – Hungary

Television channels in Estonia
Television channels in Latvia
Television channels in Lithuania
Television channels and stations established in 1987